Walt Brown (December 30, 1911 – July 29, 1951) was an American racecar driver.  A Champ Car specialist, his career in the big cars began in 1941, and he recorded one win, in 1948 at Langhorne Speedway.

Brown died in a low speed accident at Williams Grove Speedway on 29 July 1951, the day widely known as "Black Sunday" because two other drivers also died (in consecutive qualifying runs at Funk's Speedway in Winchester, Indiana) on the same day.

Complete AAA Championship Car results

Indianapolis 500 results

Complete Formula One World Championship results
(key)

References

External links

1911 births
1951 deaths
People from Springfield, New York
Racing drivers from New York (state)
Indianapolis 500 drivers
AAA Championship Car drivers
Racing drivers who died while racing
Sports deaths in Pennsylvania
Burials at Saint Charles Cemetery